Monacilioni is a small town in the province of Campobasso, Molise, southern Italy, located  northeast of Campobasso.

Monacilioni was originally shaped in a circular fashion with one main intersecting street. During the latter half of the 20th century, a significant portion of the town was destroyed in a series of landslides.

References

Geography of Molise